The Molson Brewery in Edmonton was a commercial brewery that served the province of Alberta, Canada, from 1913 until 2007 when it was closed.

History
The building was built in 1913 by local hotelier, politician and businessman William Henry Sheppard, a former mayor of Strathcona, after he had purchased land in Groat Estates to expand his brewery company. Chicago architect Bernard Barthel was hired to design the building, who had built a reputation for designing breweries modelled on the castles of his German homeland. The building cost $250,000 to construct.

The brewery was sold to Fritz Sick of Lethbridge in 1927, and acquired by Molson in 1958.

In 1961, the company built a decorative building meant to resemble a fur trade fort in front of the brewery. Named Molson House, it was used as a hospitality lounge to entertain customers. In April 2008, Molson-Coors, the owner of the site, offered to give the building away to any organization that would pay to move it off the property. The building was dismantled and moved in 2011 after it was bought by an anonymous Edmonton family.

Molson closed the brewery in August 2007 due to an ongoing worker's strike, the shift in consumer preferences from bottled to canned beer and the company's loss of a contract to brew the Foster's Group brand. As a result of the closure, 136 people were laid off.

The site was redeveloped as the Edmonton Brewery District, integrating the former brewery with residential, retail and commercial space.

References

Buildings and structures in Edmonton
1913 establishments in Alberta
2007 disestablishments in Alberta
Manufacturing plants in Canada
Defunct breweries of Canada
Brewery buildings
Molson Coors Beverage Company
Cuisine of Alberta
Food and drink companies established in 1913
Provincial Historic Resources in Edmonton
Canadian companies established in 1913